Wolfgang Neff (8 September 1875 – after November 1936) was an Austrian film director. He directed 50 films between 1920 and 1930. He was born in Prague, Bohemia, Austria-Hungary (now Czech Republic).

Selected filmography

 Nat Pinkerton im Kampf (1920)
 Die verschwundene Million (1921)
 Raid (1921)
 The Queen of Whitechapel  (1922)
 Fratricide (1922)
 The Cigarette Countess (1922)
 Yellow Star (1922)
 The Woman from the Orient (1923)
 The Heart of Lilian Thorland (1924)
 The Old Ballroom (1925)
 The Salesgirl from the Fashion Store (1925)
 People in Need (1925)
 Ash Wednesday (1925)
 German Women - German Faithfulness (1927)
 The Harbour Bride (1927)
 The Girl from Frisco (1927)
 The Lorelei (1927)
 Circus Renz (1927)
 Who Invented Divorce? (1928)
 Dawn (1929)

References

External links

1875 births
Austrian film directors
Year of death unknown
Film directors from Prague